Levan, son of Bakar or Leon Bakarovich Gruzinsky (6 September 1728 – 23 June 1763) was a Georgian prince of the Mukhrani branch of the royal Bagrationi dynasty. In Russia he bore the surname of Gruzinsky.

Career 
Prince Levan was the son of Prince Bakar of Kartli who had followed his father Vakhtang VI of Kartli, the king of Kartli, into exile to Russia in 1724. Levan was educated at the University of Moscow and, beyond Georgian and Russian, commanded Latin, French, and German languages. Like many of his family members and relatives, he then pursued a military career. He served in the elite Izmaylovsky Regiment, attaining to the rank of second major of the Imperial Russian Army. Levan was keenly interested in history and authored one of the first Georgian textbooks in world history, outlining the history of about 50 countries and peoples. Prince Levan died on 23 June 1763. He was buried at the Donskoy Monastery in Moscow.

Family 
In 1752 Levan married Princess Aleksandra Yakovlevna Sibirsky (1728-1793), whose grandmother was sister of the Tsaritsa of Russia Agafya Grushetskaya. After the marriage Prince Levan moved to the village of Brynkovo, a dowry of his wife. Prince Levan lived 13 years in marriage and left a widowed 35-year-old wife. The couple had nine children, of whom, Princess Anna married Alexander Dadiani of the Georgian noble House of Dadiani.

The children of Prince Levan with Princess Aleksandra Sibirsky were:

Iakob Gruzinsky
Dimitri Bagration-Gruzinsky
Leon Bagration-Gruzinsky
Alexander Bagration-Gruzinsky
Marta Bagration-Gruzinsky
Daria Bagration-Gruzinsky
Maria Bagration-Gruzinsky
Sofia Bagration-Gruzinsky
Anastasia Bagration-Gruzinsky

The 19th-century artist Pyotr Gruzinsky was Levan's descendant through his son, Iakob. He was the last direct male descendant of King Vakhtang VI of Kartli and the last in the Gruzinsky line.

References

Further reading
Петров П.Н. Князья Сибирские // История российской геральдики / Н. Дубенюк. — М: Эксмо, 2009. — С. 508. — 576 с. — (Российская императорская библиотека)

1728 births
1763 deaths
House of Mukhrani
Georgian princes
18th-century historians from Georgia (country)
Imperial Russian Army personnel